Nick McLennan (born 23 June 1988) is a New Zealand born Rugby Union footballer who plays as Stand-off/Fullback/Centre for Edinburgh Rugby in the Pro14 and the Scotland Sevens team.

Born in New Zealand, he qualifies for Scotland through his grandmother, Jean, from Balmoral, and his grandfather, Alexander McLennan, who was from Dunblane and served with the Gordon Highlanders.

He made his Sevens début at the Dubai 7s reaching the Plate final.

References

External links
http://www.edinburghrugby.org/edinburgh-rugby/player/nick-mclennan

1988 births
Living people
Rugby union players from Oamaru
Canterbury rugby union players
Hawke's Bay rugby union players
New Zealand rugby union players
North Otago rugby union players
Scotland international rugby sevens players
Male rugby sevens players
Expatriate rugby union players in Scotland
New Zealand expatriate sportspeople in Scotland